Boris Radunović (born 26 May 1996) is a Serbian professional footballer who plays as a goalkeeper for  club Cagliari.

Club career

Rad
Radunović made his professional debut for Rad on his 17th birthday, 26 May 2013, in a Serbian SuperLiga match versus Radnički Niš, when he was substituted on for Filip Kljajić.

Atalanta
On 18 July 2015, Atalanta confirmed the signing of Radunović for an undisclosed fee.

On 31 July 2018, Radunović joined Cremonese on loan until 30 June 2019.

On 15 July 2019, he joined Hellas Verona on loan until 30 June 2020.

Cagliari Calcio
On 11 July 2021, he signed a four-year contract with Serie A club Cagliari.

Personal life
He is a twin brother of Pavle Radunović.

Career statistics

References

External links
 Boris Radunović stats at utakmica.rs 
 

Living people
Twin sportspeople
Serbian twins
1996 births
Footballers from Belgrade
Association football goalkeepers
Serbian footballers
Serbia youth international footballers
Serbia under-21 international footballers
Serbian SuperLiga players
FK Rad players
Atalanta B.C. players
U.S. Cremonese players
Hellas Verona F.C. players
Cagliari Calcio players
Serie A players
Serie B players
Serbian expatriate footballers
Expatriate footballers in Italy